is a private university in Munakata, Fukuoka, Japan, established in 2001.

Undergraduate schools 
 Faculty of Nursing (with the start of a four-year curriculum in 2001)

Graduate schools 
 Masterʼs Program in Nursing (Master's program was started in 2007)

Laboratory 
 Research Center for International Programs and Services

University affiliations 
 Japanese Red Cross Hokkaido College of Nursing
 The Japanese Red Cross Akita College of Nursing
 The Japanese Red Cross College of Akita
 Japanese Red Cross College of Nursing
 Japanese Red Cross Toyota College of Nursing
 The Japanese Red Cross Hiroshima College of Nursing

International exchange agreements 
 The Korean Red Cross College of Nursing
 Dankook University
 The Thai Red Cross College of Nursing
 Khon Kaen University
 Nam Dinh University of Nursing
 University of Indonesia

References

External links
 Official website 

Educational institutions established in 2001
Private universities and colleges in Japan
Universities and colleges in Fukuoka Prefecture
Nursing schools in Japan
2001 establishments in Japan